Major General William Azure Ayamdo is a retired Ghanaian military officer who is former Chief of Army Staff of the Ghana Army. He was appointed to the position by President Akuffo-Addo on 9 February 2017. He retired and handed over to Thomas Oppong Peprah

References

Chiefs of Army Staff (Ghana)
Living people
Year of birth missing (living people)